Football Federation of Vinnytsia Oblast is a football governing body in the region of Vinnytsia Oblast, Ukraine. The federation is a member of the Football Federation of Ukraine.

Previous Champions

1992-93 FC Intehral Vinnytsia (1)
1993-94 FC Podillya Kyrnasivka (1)
1994-95 FC Podillya Kyrnasivka (2)
1995-96 FC Khimik Vinnytsia (1)
1996-97 FC Fortuna Sharhorod (1)
1997-98 FC Kirovets Mohyliv-Podilskyi (1)
1998-99 FC Podillya Kyrnasivka (3)
1999-00 FC Podillya Kyrnasivka (4)
2000-01 FC Podillya Kyrnasivka (5)
2001-02 FC Kirovets Mohyliv-Podilskyi (2)
2002-03 FC Podillya–ML Kyrnasivka (6)
2003-04 FC Podillya–ML Tulchyn (7)
2004-05 FC Podillya–Lis Kyrnasivka (8)
2005-06 FC Lisovyk–Podillya Tulchyn (9)
2006-07 FC Avanhard Sutysky (1)
2007-08 OLKAR Sharhorod (1)
2008-09 FC Avanhard Sutysky (2)
2009-10 FC Vylam Khmilnyk (1)
2010-11 ????
2011-12 ????
2012-13 FC Vinnytsia (1)
2013-14 FC Shlyakhovyk Pohrebyshche (1)
2014-15 FC Patriot Kukavka (1)
2015-16 ????
2016-17 FC EMS–Podillya Vinnytsia (1)
2017-18 FC Svitanok–Ahrosvit Shlyakhova (1)
2018-19 FC Svitanok–Ahrosvit Shlyakhova (2)

Top winners
 9 – FC Podillya Kyrnasivka
 2 – 3 clubs (Kirovets, Avanhard, Svitanok-Ahrosvit)
 1 – 9 clubs

Professional clubs
 FC Spartak Vinnytsia, 1946
 FC Nyva Vinnytsia (Lokomotiv), 1958-1968

See also
 FFU Council of Regions

References

External links
 Official website. Vinnytsia Oblast Football Federation (VOFF)
 Buha, B. The golden epoch of Kyrnasivka (Золота епоха Кирнасівки). FFU. 31 December 2010.
 Buha, B. A semifinal that was more important than the final (Півфінал, що був важливішим за фінал). FFU. 12 December 2010.
 Buha, B. An eternal loyalty of Pasha Kasanov (Вічна вірність Паши Касанова). FFU. 21 December 2010.
 Buha, B. The Locomotive of Vinnytsia Football («Локомотив» вінницького футболу). FFU. 23 December 2010.
 Buha, B. How the Vinnytsia residents have spotted the Communism (Як вінничани комунізм побачили). FFU. 30 December 2010.
 Buha, B. Hundred years is only the beginning (Сто років – це лише початок). FFU. 31 December 2010.

Football in the regions of Ukraine
Football governing bodies in Ukraine
Sport in Vinnytsia Oblast